Chururuyuq (chururu local name for a kind of flamingo (Phoenicoparrus jamesi, also applied for Phoenicoparrus andinus) "the one with the chururu", Hispanicized spelling Chururuyo) is a  mountain in the Andes of Peru. It is located in the Lima Region, Huaura Province, Santa Leonor District. It lies northeast of Chururu.

References

Mountains of Peru
Mountains of Lima Region